Louis Grivel (30 October 1901 – 20 February 1969) was a Swiss writer. His work was part of the art competitions at the 1928 Summer Olympics and the 1936 Summer Olympics.

References

1901 births
1969 deaths
Swiss male writers
Olympic competitors in art competitions
Place of birth missing